Mineko (written: 峰子, 美猫 or 美音子) is a feminine Japanese given name. Notable people with the name include:

Mineko Grimmer (born 1949), Japanese sound artist
, Japanese businesswoman and writer
, Japanese actress and singer
, Japanese manga artist
, Japanese handball player

Japanese feminine given names